The Least Expected Day: Inside the Movistar Team 2019 is a documentary series produced by Netflix to give an exclusive behind-the-scenes look at the riders in the Movistar Team. The original Spanish title for the series is El Día Menos Pensado.

The first season covers the 2019 UCI World Tour and premiered on 27 March 2020. The second season continues with the 2020 UCI World Tour and premiered on 28 May 2021.

Episodes

Season 1 (2020)

Season 2 (2021)

Production

Release
On 24 December 2019, the series was announced and on 27 March 2020, the series premiered on Netflix.

References

External links
 

Netflix original documentary television series
Spanish-language television shows
2019 in road cycling
Documentary television series about sports
Documentary films about cycling